Hydromorphus is a genus of snakes in the subfamily Dipsadinae.

Geographic range
The genus Hydromorphus is endemic to Central America.

Species
Two species are recognized as being valid.
Hydromorphus concolor  - Costa Rica water snake
Hydromorphus dunni  - Dunn's water snake

Etymology
The specific name, dunni, is in honor of American herpetologist Emmett Reid Dunn.

References

Further reading
Boulenger GA (1894). Catalogue of the Snakes in the British Museum (Natural History). Volume II., Containing the Conclusion of the Colubridæ Aglyphæ. London: Trustees of the British Museum (Natural History). (Taylor and Francis, printers). xi + 382 pp. + Plates I-XX. (Genus Hydromorphus, p. 185; species H. concolor, p. 185).
Peters W (1859). "Über die von Hrn. Dr. Hoffman in Costa Rica gesammelten und an das Königl. zoologische Museum gesandten Schlangen ". Monatsbericht der Königlichen Preussischen Akademie der Wissenschaften zu Berlin 1859: 275-278. (Hydromorphus, new genus, pp. 276–277; H. concolor, new species, p. 277). (in German).
Slevin JR (1942). "Notes on a Collection of Reptiles from Boquete, Panama, with the Description of a New Species of Hydromorphus ". Proceedings of the California Acadademy of Sciences, Fourth Series 23: 463-480 + Plates 39-42. (Hydromorphus dunni, new species, p. 474 + Plate 39, figures 1-3).

Hydromorphus
Snake genera
Taxa named by Wilhelm Peters